In the mathematical field of knot theory, an unlink is a link that is equivalent (under ambient isotopy) to finitely many disjoint circles in the plane.

Properties 
 An n-component link L ⊂ S3 is an unlink if and only if there exists n disjointly embedded discs Di ⊂ S3 such that L = ∪i∂Di.
 A link with one component is an unlink if and only if it is the unknot.
 The link group of an n-component unlink is the free group on n generators, and is used in classifying Brunnian links.

Examples 
 The Hopf link is a simple example of a link with two components that is not an unlink.
 The Borromean rings form a link with three components that is not an unlink; however, any two of the rings considered on their own do form a two-component unlink.
 Taizo Kanenobu has shown that for all n > 1 there exists a hyperbolic link of n components such that any proper sublink is an unlink (a Brunnian link). The Whitehead link and Borromean rings are such examples for n = 2, 3.

See also
Linking number

References

Further reading
Kawauchi, A. A Survey of Knot Theory. Birkhauser.